TAF6-like RNA polymerase II p300/CBP-associated factor-associated factor 65 kDa subunit 6L is an enzyme that in humans is encoded by the TAF6L gene.

Function 

Initiation of transcription by RNA polymerase II requires the activities of more than 70 polypeptides. The protein that coordinates these activities is transcription factor IID (TFIID), which binds to the core promoter to position the polymerase properly, serves as the scaffold for assembly of the remainder of the transcription complex, and acts as a channel for regulatory signals. TFIID is composed of the TATA-binding protein (TBP) and a group of evolutionarily conserved proteins known as TBP-associated factors or TAFs. TAFs may participate in basal transcription, serve as coactivators, function in promoter recognition or modify general transcription factors (GTFs) to facilitate complex assembly and transcription initiation. This gene encodes a protein that is a component of the PCAF histone acetylase complex and structurally similar to one of the histone-like TAFs, TAF6. The PCAF histone acetylase complex, which is composed of more than 20 polypeptides some of which are TAFs, is required for myogenic transcription and differentiation.

Interactions 

TAF6L has been shown to interact with TAF9 and Transcription initiation protein SPT3 homolog.

References

Further reading